Huntley Kekwick (5 March 1875 – 29 August 1950) was an Australian cricketer. He played in two first-class matches for South Australia in 1899/1900.

See also
 List of South Australian representative cricketers

References

External links
 

1875 births
1950 deaths
Australian cricketers
South Australia cricketers